John Black Lee was  born in Chicago in 1924. He was a mid-century modern architect based in New Canaan, Connecticut.  His inspiration came from Marcel Breuer and Philip C. Johnson.  Lee designed multiple homes in New Canaan and beyond.  One of his most famous is the Desilver house, built in 1961.  This house was later made into a “kit” house, meaning its plans were published and marketed to be built with conceived parts to be designed quickly and efficiently that can be copied all across the country.

Lee's college years at Brown University were interrupted by service in the Navy V-12 Program and subsequent assignment. Returning after the war he graduated and eventually joined Eliot Noyes' firm in New Canaan before opening his own office. Among the many great houses he designed in that town are two he built for himself and one he did for the Day family.
 
His work has received a number of architectural awards.

One of his most prominent houses at New Canaan, constructed in 1956 originally for himself and his family, was renovated in 2010 by Japanese architect Kengo Kuma.

He died April 13, 2016, of natural causes at the age of 91.

Selected works
Lee House I
Lee House II
DeSilver House
Teaze House

References

1924 births

2016 deaths

American architects

Brown University alumni
People from New Canaan, Connecticut